Franklin Long may refer to:

 Franklin A. Long (1910–1999), American chemist
 Franklin B. Long (1842–1912), American architect in Minneapolis, Minnesota